Rochford was a County Constituency in Essex, represented in the House of Commons of the Parliament of the United Kingdom from 1983 until 1997. It elected one Member of Parliament (MP) by the first past the post system of election.

History 
The seat was created for the 1983 general election from parts of the Maldon, Chelmsford and abolished South East Essex constituencies. It was abolished at the next redistribution which came into effect for the 1997 general election, when it was largely replaced by the new constituency of Rayleigh, with the town of Rochford itself being included in the new constituency of Rochford and Southend East.

It was held by Michael Clark for the Conservatives throughout its existence.

Boundaries
The District of Rochford, and the Borough of Chelmsford wards of Ramsden Heath and Downham, Rettendon and South Hanningfield, Runwell, Woodham Ferrers North, and Woodham Ferrers South.

The District of Rochford comprised the former Rural District of Rochford, which had been part of the Maldon constituency, and the former Urban District of Rayleigh, which had been part of the abolished South East Essex constituency.  The Borough of Chelmsford wards had previously been in the Chelmsford constituency.

On abolition in 1997, the bulk of the constituency formed the new constituency of Rayleigh, with Rochford and Great Wakering being included in the new constituency of Rochford and Southend East.

Members of Parliament

Elections

Elections in the 1980s

Elections in the 1990s

Notes and references

Parliamentary constituencies in Essex (historic)
Constituencies of the Parliament of the United Kingdom established in 1983
Constituencies of the Parliament of the United Kingdom disestablished in 1997